The women's 400 metres hurdles event at the 2013 Asian Athletics Championships was held at the Shree Shiv Chhatrapati Sports Complex on 7 July.

Results

References
Results

400 Hurdles Women's
400 metres hurdles at the Asian Athletics Championships
2013 in women's athletics